Mahensia is a genus of moths in the subfamily Arctiinae. It contains the single species Mahensia seychellarum, which is found on the Seychelles.

References

Natural History Museum Lepidoptera generic names catalog

Lithosiini